Yanıkkışla is a village in Tarsus district of Mersin Province, Turkey. At  it is situated to the east of Turkish state highway   . The population of village was 453  as of 2012.

References

Villages in Tarsus District